This is a list of the Lebanon national football team results from 1940 to 1989.

Lebanon's first official international game was played in 1940 against Mandatory Palestine in a 5–1 defeat; Camille Cordahi scored Lebanon's first international goal.

While Lebanon would not participate in World Cup qualifiers until 1994, they participated in the 1972 and 1980 Asian Cup qualifiers, failing to qualify in both occasions. Lebanon hosted the inaugural edition of the Arab Nations Cup in 1963, finishing in third place. They would also participate in 1964 and 1966, where they finished in fourth place on both occasions, as well as in 1988. Lebanon also participated in the Pan Arab Games in 1953, 1957, which they hosted and where they finished in third place, 1961, where they finished in fourth place, and 1965. Lebanon also hosted the 1959 Mediterranean Games, where they finished in third place, and participated in the 1963 edition.

Results

1940s

1950s

1960s

1970s

1980s

External links
Lebanon fixtures on FIFA.com
Lebanon fixtures on eloratings.net
Lebanon fixtures on RSSSF.com
International matches on RSSSF.com

1940s in Lebanon
1950s in Lebanese sport
1960s in Lebanese sport
1970s in Lebanese sport
1980s in Lebanese sport
1940-89